Pepco usually refers to the Potomac Electric Power Company.

Pepco or PEPCO may also refer to:

 Pakistan Electric Power Company
 Pepco, a retail chain in Europe owned by Pepkor

See also
 Pep&Co